Jock Campbell (born 17 May 1995) is an Australian rugby union player who plays for the Queensland Reds in Super Rugby. His playing position is wing and fullback. He has signed for the Reds in 2020.

References

External links
Rugby.com.au profile
itsrugby.co.uk profile

1995 births
Sportspeople from the Gold Coast, Queensland
Australian rugby union players
Living people
Rugby union wings
Rugby union fullbacks
Queensland Country (NRC team) players
Queensland Reds players
Australia international rugby union players